David Painter or Panter may refer to:
David Painter (priest) (born 1944), English clergyman, Archdeacon of Oakham
David S. Painter (born 1948), American historian
David Panter or Painter (died 1558), Scottish diplomat, clerk and bishop of Ross

See also
David Paynter (disambiguation)